The Ingle Building is an historic structure located at 801 4th Avenue in the Gaslamp Quarter, San Diego, in the U.S. state of California. It was built in 1906 and housed the Golden Lion Tavern. Currently, the building is home to Hard Rock Cafe.

See also
 List of Gaslamp Quarter historic buildings

References

External links

 

1906 establishments in California
Buildings and structures completed in 1906
Buildings and structures in San Diego
Gaslamp Quarter, San Diego